The following results are for the 2022 Badminton Asia Championships group stage, which decide who will advance to the knockout stage.

Men's singles

Group A

Group B

Group C

Group D

Women's singles

Group A

Group B

Group C

Group D

Women's doubles

Group B

Group C

Group D

External links
 tournamentsoftware.com

Badminton Asia Championships
2022 in badminton